Pellissier may refer to:

Christophe Pélissier (businessman), or Pellissier, (1728–1779), French merchant
Daniele Pellissier (born 1905), French-Italian cross-country skier
Gloriana Pellissier (born 1976), Italian ski mountaineer
Guillaume Pellicier, or Pellissier, (c.1490–1568), French prelate and diplomat

Sergio Pellissier (born 1979), Italian footballer

See also
Pélissier

French-language surnames
Occupational surnames